The small-toothed palm civet (Arctogalidia trivirgata), also known as the three-striped palm civet, is a viverrid native to dense forests of Southeast Asia, from the Assam district of India to Indochina and the Malay Peninsula and on Sumatra, Bangka, Java, Borneo, and numerous small nearby islands of Indonesia.

The first scientific description by John Edward Gray in 1832 was based on a zoological specimen from the Maluku Islands in the collection of the Rijksmuseum van Natuurlijke Historie in Leiden, Netherlands. It is blackish grey, has black paws and three black longitudinal stripes on the back.

A monotypic genus, Arctogalidia means ‘bear-weasel’ (from ancient Greek arkto- ‘bear’ + galidia ‘little weasel’). The specific epithet trivirgata means ‘three-striped’ in Latin.

It has short fur that is generally a tawny or buff color while the head is a darker greyish tawny. Its muzzle is brown with a white streak that extends from the nose to the forehead. Only the females have the perineal scent gland, located near the vulva.

The diet is varied and omnivorous, and usually consists of insects, small mammals, nesting birds, fruits, frogs and lizards. Matching the habits of other palm civets, this species is solitary, arboreal and nocturnal. Its gestation period is 45 days, and the average litter size is 3, which are born in dens made in the trees. Young open their eyes at 11 days and are weaned at two months. It can have two litters a year and there is no set mating season. It can live for 11 years. It is threatened primarily by deforestation, as are many Southeast Asian forest animals.

References

Mammals of Bangladesh
Mammals of India
Mammals of Southeast Asia
Mammals of Thailand
Mammals of Myanmar
Mammals of China
Mammals of Cambodia
Mammals of Laos
Mammals of Vietnam
Carnivorans of Malaysia
Mammals of Indonesia
Mammals of Borneo
Fauna of Sumatra
Mammals of Singapore
Mammals described in 1832
Taxa named by John Edward Gray